Louis Fratino (1993, Annapolis, MD) is an American visual artist.

Education 

Fratino graduated from the Maryland Institute College of Art, Baltimore, MD in 2015. Fratino was a recipient of a Fulbright Research Fellowship in Painting, Berlin, 2015–2016 and a Yale Norfolk Painting Fellowship, Norfolk, CT in 2014.

Work 
Fratino collects illustrated children's books. Some of his paintings are based on the photographs of Vince Aletti in Male.  

Art critic Holland Carter writes of Fratino's paintings, "Seemingly painted mostly in the same interior, they are also hot with the pleasure of lying-around-the-house domesticity, of shared privacy. And they are hot too with painterly attention and erudition — inviting a similar scrutiny from the viewer. Nearly every brush stroke and mark, every detail of furnishings and body hair, has a life of its own." Similarly, Antwaun Sargent writes in The New York Times, "Fratino and these other contemporary gay figure artists share a philosophy, despite their different aesthetics: They’re all committed to reflecting the mostly unseen interior lives of the men they admire, and to celebrating a diverse set of subjects who, taken together, stand in opposition to a canonical history of art that has long ignored an openly gay view of the male body."

Exhibitions 

Come Softly to Me, Sikkema Jenkins & Co., New York, NY, 2019
 Heirloom, Galerie Antoine Levi, Paris, France, 2018
 So, I’ve got you, Thierry Goldberg Gallery, New York, NY, 2017
 Own, Only, Monya Rowe Gallery, St. Augustine, FL, 2017
 With everyone, Thierry Goldberg Gallery, New York, NY, 2016
 Reasons, Platform Gallery, Baltimore, MD, 2016

References

American artists
Living people
Year of birth missing (living people)
American gay artists